Aziz El Amri (born 1 January 1950) is a Moroccan football coach and former player. 

El Amri was manager of Moghreb Tétouan until resigning in December 2014.

References

1950 births
Living people
People from Sidi Kacem
Moroccan footballers
Association football midfielders
Moroccan football managers
AS FAR (football) managers
Moghreb Tétouan managers
Ittihad Tanger managers
COD Meknès managers
Al Kharaitiyat SC managers
Kawkab Marrakech managers
Olympic Club de Safi managers